Penicillium intermedium is a species of the genus of Penicillium.

References

intermedium
Fungi described in 1972